Longville railway station was a station in Longville in the Dale, Shropshire, England. The station was opened in 1867 and closed in 1951. The station is now in use as a private residence.

References

Disused railway stations in Shropshire
Railway stations in Great Britain opened in 1867
Railway stations in Great Britain closed in 1951
Former Great Western Railway stations